John Blackmore (born 1 January 1948) is a New Zealand cricketer. He played in one List A and fourteen first-class matches for Northern Districts from 1968 to 1973.

See also
 List of Northern Districts representative cricketers

References

External links
 

1948 births
Living people
New Zealand cricketers
Northern Districts cricketers
Cricketers from Hastings, New Zealand